Julio César de León Dailey (born 13 September 1979) is a Honduran footballer who currently plays for Olancho F.C. in the Honduran Liga Nacional de Ascenso as a midfielder. He is known for being a free-kick specialist and was an important key for the Honduras national football team.

Club career

Early career
Nicknamed Rambo, he made his debut for C.D. Platense in 1996 against Real Maya of Tegucigalpa, scoring his first National Soccer League goal. His last goal in the Honduras National League was playing for Olimpia on 26 May 2001 against Club Broncos of Choluteca. Earning a good reputation in Honduras, de León moved abroad to Mexico's First Division, where he played for Atletico Celaya.

After the season was over, Atletico Celaya did not renew his contract, so he returned to Honduras and became part of C.D. Olimpia of Tegucigalpa. Once he finished his one-year contract with Olimpia, he left for Uruguay where he played shortly for Deportivo Maldonado.

Reggina
From there, de León moved to Reggina of Serie B in Italy. De León started off very well for his new club. With his goals and assists, 'Rambo' helped his team to regain a place in the Italy's Serie A. Once in the first division, de León's participation was intermittent, partly due to the acquisition of the Japanese international Shunsuke Nakamura. De León was relegated to the bench, playing on and off as a substitute player.

The following seasons in Italy proved to be frustrating for "Rambo". He was sent on loan back to Serie B where he played for a number of teams, including Fiorentina, Teramo and Catanzaro. His lack of playing time continued to such degree, that he was sent to the third division or Serie C1, where he played for Sambenedettese. In 2006, 'Rambo' was requested by coach Mazzarri to come back to Reggina Calcio. De León was given a new chance, and he took it. For a while de León was considered the team's most valuable player.

Genoa
However, on 16 January 2007, De León was transferred by Reggina Calcio again, this time in a permanent deal to Genoa of Serie B, for €3.2 million, along with Filippo Carobbio (co-ownership), hoping that his services would help the team to regain a spot in the Serie A. The fans of Reggina disapproved of the sale of de León, in a time when the team really needed his talent. But the president of the team, Lillo Foti, justified the sale with economic reasons: "The offer was good and it was something that we could not refuse.".

On 10 June 2007, de León's new team, Genoa, did regain a spot in Serie A, tying at home with Napoli 0–0. After this, his last game of the season, and some subsequent celebrations, de León quickly traveled to Houston, Texas where the Honduras national team would play Cuba on 13 June 2007. He helped Honduras reach the quarter-finals of the 2007 CONCACAF Gold Cup.

Parma
He was awarded the 'Player of the Season' award by Genoa. but eventually sold to Parma of Serie B, for €2.9 million,; Parma player Andrea Gasbarroni (€2M) and Magnus Troest (50% rights for €1.5M) moved to opposite side as part of the deal. His Genoa team-mate Alessandro Lucarelli (€1.2M) also joined the Emilia–Romagna side.

He scored his first goal for the team on 28 November 2008 after a perfectly executed free kick to the corner. Then, he made his second and third goals against Grosseto on 14 February 2009 in Parma's 4–0 victory. He scored his fourth goal for the club on 17 March 2009 against A.C. Mantova in the 82nd minute to put Parma up 1–0 and eventually win the match. His fifth goal was a long-range free kick effort against Pisa F.C. to make the match 2–0 and almost guarantee promotion for Parma into Serie A of Italy. On 16 May 2009, Julio César de León celebrated the fifth promotion of his career, this time with Parma FC. He finished the season with a total of six goals and also contributed several assists, which proved vital for their return to Serie A.

After having not played for Parma in the first two games, on 28 August 2009, he was loaned to Torino in the Serie B along with Manuel Coppola, as part of Nicola Amoruso deal. He missed the promotion playoffs of Toro due to international call-up.

From Shandong Luneng to Messina to Real Sociedad
At the start of 2010–11 Serie A he was sold to Shandong Luneng for just €775. In the 2011–2012 season he has played for F.C. Motagua. In 2012, he played for Messina in the Italian Serie D and then moved to newly promoted C.D. Real Sociedad in Honduras.

International career
De León played at the 1999 World Youth Cup and made his senior debut for Honduras in a May 1999 friendly match against Haiti. As of December 2012, he has earned a total of 83 caps, scoring 14 goals. He has represented his country in 34 FIFA World Cup qualification matches and played at the 2003 UNCAF Nations Cup as well as at the 2000, 2003 and 2007 CONCACAF Gold Cups.,

De León also competed for Honduras at the 1999 Pan American Games and 2000 Summer Olympics. and he also was part of the memorable squad in 2001 that defeated Brazil 2–0 and came third in the Copa América.

On 20 August 2008 he scored an excellent goal against Mexico to make the score 1–0 for Honduras in the first half of the match, but this goal wasn't enough to draw Pável Pardo's two goals that he scored later in the game. However, shortly after, on October, 2008, 'Rambo' was excluded from the squad by head coach Reinaldo Rueda due to injury. Julio César de León announced he was returning to Italy shortly after arriving in Miami, Florida to join the National Team for the match against Canada. Upon arrival, he lashed out against the National Team for being malequipped to treat an injury that he had conjured in Italy. The coach had a discussion with him in the hotel and he was sent back on another plane shortly after. After long amounts of speculation, he returned to the squad in February, 2009 where he had not been reported to have any problems since.

De León was originally named in the 23-men final 2010 FIFA World Cup squad, but on 15 June, one day before the opening match of Honduras, had to pull out due to injury and was replaced by Jerry Palacios, who he was given the opportunity to play alongside his two brothers.

International goals
Scores and results list Honduras' goal tally first.

Honours

Club
C.D. Platense
Honduran Cup (2): 1996, 1997

Shandong Luneng
'''2010 Chinese Super League

Notes

References

External links
 Profile - FIFA

1979 births
Living people
People from Puerto Cortés
Association football midfielders
Honduran footballers
Honduras international footballers
2000 CONCACAF Gold Cup players
2001 Copa América players
2003 UNCAF Nations Cup players
2003 CONCACAF Gold Cup players
2007 CONCACAF Gold Cup players
Olympic footballers of Honduras
Footballers at the 2000 Summer Olympics
Pan American Games medalists in football
Pan American Games silver medalists for Honduras
Footballers at the 1999 Pan American Games
Platense F.C. players
C.D. Olimpia players
Deportivo Maldonado players
Reggina 1914 players
ACF Fiorentina players
U.S. Catanzaro 1929 players
A.S. Sambenedettese players
U.S. Avellino 1912 players
S.S. Teramo Calcio players
Genoa C.F.C. players
Parma Calcio 1913 players
Torino F.C. players
Shandong Taishan F.C. players
F.C. Motagua players
C.D. Real Sociedad players
A.C.R. Messina players
Liga Nacional de Fútbol Profesional de Honduras players
Honduran Liga Nacional de Ascenso players
Serie A players
Serie B players
Chinese Super League players
Honduran expatriate footballers
Expatriate footballers in Mexico
Expatriate footballers in Uruguay
Expatriate footballers in Italy
Honduran expatriate sportspeople in Italy
Expatriate footballers in China
National Premier Soccer League players
Medalists at the 1999 Pan American Games